Real Ávila Club de Fútbol, S.A.D. is a Spanish football team based in Ávila, in the autonomous community of Castile and León. Founded in 1923, it currently plays in Tercera División RFEF – Group 8, holding home games at Estadio Adolfo Suárez, with a capacity of 6,000 seats.

History
The club was founded on 8 August 1923. Pedro Gutiérrez became its first president.

Season to season

11 seasons in Segunda División B
45 seasons in Tercera División
1 season in Tercera División RFEF

Current squad
''Updated as of 17 May 2022

Famous players
 Rony Beard
 Benji Núñez
   Rui
 Martin Wolfswinkel
 Bruno Tiago
 Ricardo
 Feliciano Rivilla
 Juan Viyuela
 Jose "Chino" Zapatera

References

External links
Official website 
Futbolme team profile 

Football clubs in Castile and León
Association football clubs established in 1923
1923 establishments in Spain
Sport in Ávila, Spain
A